Pamela Powers Hannley (born July 30, 1951) is an American activist, blogger, politician and a former Democratic member of the Arizona House of Representatives elected to represent District 9 in 2016, serving until 2023. In addition to her work in the Arizona Legislature, she is also the social media and technology editor of the American Journal of Medicine.

Early life, education and career
Powers Hannley is a native of Amherst, Ohio but has lived in Tucson, Arizona since 1981. For most of her professional career, Powers Hannley worked in public relations and corporate communications. For several years, she owned her own communication consulting and freelance writing business—Powers/Queen Associates. After receiving a Masters in Public Health from the University of Arizona, she shifted her career to public health and behavioral medicine research. She is the former Program Director and Principal Investigator for the Arizona Smokers Helpline and related Internet and evaluation services (1998-2004) and former managing editor of the American Journal of Medicine (2004–2016).

Powers Hannley received a bachelor's degree in journalism from Ohio State University in 1973 and a master's degree in public health from the University of Arizona in 1996. She also attended Muskingum College in New Concord, Ohio and Pima Community College in Tucson, Arizona. Powers Hannley is a graduate of Marion L. Steele High School in Amherst, Ohio.

Elections
 2018 – Powers Hannley runs for re-election to the Arizona House.
 2016 – Powers Hannley and Friese went on to defeat Republican Ana Henderson in the general election.
 2016 – Powers Hannley and incumbent Randall Friese defeated incumbent Matt Kopec in the Democratic Primary.

References

External links
 Biography at Ballotpedia
 Biography at Huffington Post
 Member page at the Arizona Legislature

Democratic Party members of the Arizona House of Representatives
Living people
Politicians from Tucson, Arizona
1951 births
People from Amherst, Ohio
21st-century American politicians
21st-century American women politicians
Women state legislators in Arizona
Ohio State University School of Communication alumni
University of Arizona alumni